Mohammad Reza Azadehfar, Professor in ethnomusicology and santūr performer, was born in 1969 in Isfahan, the Safavid capital of Iran. He started learning the Iranian traditional dulcimer (santūr) under the supervision of Sa’id Na’imimanesh in 1981 and spent some 4 years at the Conservatory of Isfahan. In 1988 he moved to Tehran and attended classes in the santūr given by Faramarz Payvar and Sa’id Sabet.

Azadehfar is also interested in film studies. He studied cinema at the Iranian Youth Cinema Society in 1982 and in 1988 he entered the faculty of Cinema and Theater at Tehran University of Arts to take a BA in cinema. His special interest in cinema was film scoring and editing. Azadehfar won the prize for best film scoring in 1987 for a short film by Asghar Farhadi and a prize for best editing in 1993 at the National Festival of Youth Cinema.

Since 1993 Azadehfar has mainly focused on theoretical issues of Iranian music. He began his studies by attending an MA research program in Tehran working on the topic of “General Training in Iranian Music.” His dissertation was later published as a book in the Persian language and sold more than 5000 copies. Rhythm is especially interesting to Azadehfar. He learned the Iranian percussion instrument the tombak and moved to Sheffield in England to do a PhD program on “Rhythmic Structure in Iranian Music” in 1999. He finished his PhD program in 2003 and was admitted to a post-doctoral program in SOAS, University of London in the same year. He ended his fellowship in SOAS in 2005 and returned to Iran.

In 2005 Azadehfar was appointed to the Music Faculty in Tehran University of Art. In 2010 he was elected as a Dean of the Music Faculty, a post which he held until 2014. During this time he established the Ethnomusicology program in this faculty and spent some years teaching there. He is now Ethnomusicology Professor in this faculty.

In 2014 the Executive Board of ICTM (International Council for Traditional Music) appointed Azadehfar as ICTM Liaison Officer for Iran.

Awards
1987, Winner of prize for best short film music at Isfahan Youth Cinema Festival
1988, Winner of prize for best music composition at Isfahan Music Conservatory
1995, Winner of prize for best edit (montage) of fantasy musical film: “The Familiar Voice” at Iran Youth Cinema Nation-wide Festival.
2019, Winner of prize for best author of music book: Melodic Structure in Iranian Music, awarded by Iranian National Music House.

Bibliography
 2022 Ethnomusicology Lines of Investigation [Persian Version], Published by Nashr-e Ney, Tehran, Iran  [Persian].[https://nashreney.com/content/%d8%a7%d8%aa%d9%86%d9%88%d9%85%d9%88%d8%b2%db%8c%da%a9%d9%88%d9%84%d9%88%da%98%db%8c/
 2019 Music Tourism: A Strategy for Sustainable Urban and Rural Development in Iran [Persian Version], Published by Nashr-e Markaz, Tehran, Iran  [Persian].Music Tourism
 2017 Third Edition of Rhythmic Structure in Iranian Music, published by University of Arts, Iran  [English].https://www.researchgate.net/publication/322329754_Rhythmic_structure_in_Iranian_music_3rd_Edition
 2017 Melodic Structure in Iranian Music [Persian Version], Published by Nashr-e Markaz, Tehran, Iran  [Persian].
 2017 The Basics of Melody Creation in Composition, Published by Nashr-e Markaz, Tehran, Iran  [Persian].
 2016 The Arts (Official Book of Grade 10, Secondary Schools in Iran), Published by the Iranian Ministry of Education, Curriculum and Textbook Developments Office, Tehran, Iran  [Persian].
 2016 Music in Islamic Philosophy and Theosophy, A Short Introduction, Published by Nashr-e Markaz, Tehran, Iran   [Persian].
 2016 Arts and Ethics, Published by Soureh Mehr, Tehran, Iran  [Persian].
 2014 General Knowledge of Music: An Insight into Iranian Music Theory, Dastgah System, Musical Instruments and Music History, Published by Nashre Ney, Tehran, Iran  [Persian].
 2013 Theoretical and Practical Bases of Film Music: An Essay on Film Music in the World of Islam, Published by Soroush Mehr, Tehran, Iran  [Persian].
 2011 Second Edition of Rhythmic Structure in Iranian Music, published by University of Arts, Iran  (9789646218475) [English].
 2011 Epic and Music, published by Iranian Institute for Research of Culture, Art and Communications, Tehran, Iran  [Persian].
 2006 The Rhythmic Structure in Iranian Music (402 pages, published by University of Arts, Iran)  (9789646218475) [English].
 1996 General Training in Iranian Music , [Persian].
 1992 Specialised Textbook for Concours in Arts (Entrance University Exams), Published by Jahad Daneshgahi Publications [Persian].
 1992 The 3000 Test of Art Concours, Published by Jahad Daneshgahi Publications [Persian]

References

External links

1969 births
Living people
Ethnomusicologists